Trachycephalus mambaiensis, also known as the Mambai casque-headed tree frog, is a species of frog in the family Hylidae.  It is endemic to Brazil.

References

External links

Frogs of South America
Amphibians described in 2009
Trachycephalus